Who Killed Lamb? is a 1974 TV play starring Stanley Baker as a Scotland Yard 
detective investigating a murder in Oxford. It was made by Yorkshire Television in association with David Paradine Productions Ltd. for ITV, and was screened on 16 March 1974.

DVD release 
The play is included on the 2007 Network DVD release of the film Hell Drivers, which also starred Stanley Baker and on the DVD release of Thriller (1973–76)

External links
Who Killed Lamb? at IMDb
Who Killed Lamb? at BFI

1974 television plays
British television plays